Adalberto Martínez Chávez (25 January 1916 – April 4, 2003), better known in the entertainment world as Resortes, was a renowned Mexican actor. Known primarily for his talent as a comedian, Resortes was also a dancer. His stage name is Spanish for "spring", or also "coil".

Resortes, who began his career as a member of a circus, made his motion picture debut in 1946. He participated in more than 50 Mexican movies throughout his career, and he also participated in many television series. Many of his best films he made were El Rey de México (The King of Mexico), El Cartero del Barrio, Al son del mambo (To the Mambo's Rhythm) and El Futbolista Fenómeno (The Phenomenal Soccer Player). But one of his most famous movies was La Niña de la Mochila Azul (The Girl With the Blue Back Pack). That movie also had a sequel, La Niña de la Mochila Azul 2 (The Girl With the Blue Back Pack 2). Those two movies in particular became two of the largest teen movie hits in Mexican movie history and helped Resortes gain familiarity among the younger generations during the 1980s. 

Resortes was hospitalized with emphysema on April 3, 2003, and died on April 4.

Selected filmography
 Confessions of a Taxi Driver (1949)
 They Say I'm a Communist (1951)
 My Three Merry Widows (1953)
 The King of Mexico (1956)
 La Presidenta Municipal (1975)
 La Esperanza de los Pobres (1983)

External links

1916 births
2003 deaths
Golden Ariel Award winners
Mexican male film actors
Mexican male telenovela actors
Mexican male television actors
Mexican male comedians
20th-century comedians
Deaths from emphysema